Thomas Brock (1847–1922) was an English sculptor.

Thomas Brock may also refer to:

Thomas D. Brock (1926–2021), American microbiologist
Tom Brock (singer) (1942–2002), American soul singer
Thomas Brock (opperhoved) (died 1745), Chief of the Danish Gold Coast
Tom Brock (cricketer) (born 1994), English cricketer
Tom Brock (historian), Australian sports historian, see Tom Brock Lecture